The Bavarian Rhön Nature Park  (Naturpark Bayerische Rhön) straddles the junction of the German states of Bavaria,
Hesse and Thuringia.  70 km2 of the total 125 km2 area of the nature park has been recognised by UNESCO as part of the Rhön Biosphere Reserve.
The organisation for the promotion of the Bavarian Rhön Nature Park (Zweckverband Naturpark Bayerische Rhön) was founded in 1967. On 26 November 1982 the regulation for the Naturpark Bayerische Rhön was issued and, in 1997, the Zweckverband became the Society for the Bavarian Rhön Nature Park and Biosphere Reserve (Naturpark und Biosphärenreservat Bayer. Rhön e.V.).

Landscape 
The nature park lies between the Spessart, Vogelsberg, Thuringian Forest, Haßberge and Steigerwald forest. It is characterised by mixed forests, streams of flowing water, moors, grassland and arid habitats.

See also 
 List of nature parks in Germany
 Rhön Biosphere Reserve

External links
 Bavarian Rhön Nature Park
 Rhön Biosphere Reserve

Nature parks in Bavaria
Rhön Mountains